Niagara Falls station is a railway station in Niagara Falls, Ontario, Canada. It is served by the Maple Leaf train between Toronto and New York City and is the terminus of GO Transit's Lakeshore West line towards Toronto. The Gothic Revival station building, which was built in 1879 by the Great Western Railway, is a designated heritage railway station. It is also listed on the Canadian Register of Historic Places.

History

The Victorian Gothic Revival style station was built as the terminus for Great Western Railway (1879–1882) and Grand Trunk Railway (1882–1923). During the period, it was the busiest and the grandest station owned by the railway. The station was renovated in 1951, and the east wing, once housing a restaurant, was partially demolished in 1967. It was acquired by CN Rail for passenger service from 1923 until the 1970s, since when it has been used by Via Rail Canada and more recently by GO Transit since 2009.

In 2012, as a result of federal funding cuts Via Rail Corridor trips between Toronto and Niagara Falls were discontinued, leaving only the single daily Via/Amtrak Maple Leaf service between Toronto and New York. In October 2012, the ticket agent was eliminated, replaced by an automated kiosk.

GO Transit operated summer 'excursion' trains to Niagara Falls on weekends and holidays in 2009 and 2010, making them permanently recurring in 2011. Starting in January 2019, it also began operating a single weekday train trip to and from Niagara Falls. In September 2019, the formerly summer-only weekend train service was extended year-round.

GO Transit was expected to expand full-time rail service along the Niagara Branch to Niagara Falls by 2023 and with it upgrades to the station.

Services
On weekdays as of September 2021, the station is served by one daily round trip on the GO Transit Lakeshore West line, departing toward Toronto in the morning and returning in the evening. On weekends the station is served by four daily trains in each direction throughout the day. At all times, GO Transit bus route 12 operates hourly to Burlington GO Station, where it connects to regular train service to Toronto.

Amtrak and Via Rail Canada jointly operate the Maple Leaf train service between Toronto and New York City. The service uses Amtrak rolling stock, but ticketing is shared, and Via crew operates the train along all Canadian stops until it reaches the station where Amtrak crew takes over the operation. The station was served once daily in each direction until March 2020, when Maple Leaf service within Canada was suspended indefinitely as part of a closure of the Canada–United States border to non-essential travel in response to the ongoing coronavirus pandemic. Trains from New York City were truncated to Niagara Falls, New York.  Full service between New York City and Toronto resumed on July 27, 2022.

Customs
There are no US preclearance facilities at the station for the Maple Leaf train since both it and its sister station in Niagara Falls, New York, are located along the Canada-US border. Therefore, passengers arriving from the US will be inspected by Canada Border Services Agency (CBSA) officers at the station. Passengers leaving for the US will be processed by Customs and Border Protection (CBP) officers at the Niagara Falls, New York, station on the other side of the Whirlpool Rapids Bridge.

In January 2020, US Senator Chuck Schumer of New York urged the CBSA to open a preclearance facility in the newer Niagara Falls, New York station as one of Canada’s first preclearance operations to improve what he described as an “unpleasant” Canadian inspection experience in the current open-air and uncovered location. In response, the CBSA said it would not commit to a timeline to open any preclearance facilities in the US.

Niagara Falls Transit Terminal

The Niagara Falls Transit Terminal is located directly across Bridge Street from the railway station and serves as the main local, regional and intercity bus terminal for the area. Unlike the train station, the transit terminal is owned and operated by the city of Niagara Falls, Ontario.

References

External links

Niagara Falls Via Rail Station (Canada RailGuide - TrainWeb)

Via Rail stations in Ontario
Amtrak stations in Canada
Great Western Railway (Ontario)
Grand Trunk Railway stations in Ontario
GO Transit railway stations
Transport in Niagara Falls, Ontario
Designated heritage railway stations in Ontario
Railway stations in Canada opened in 1879
1879 establishments in Ontario
Designated heritage properties in Ontario
Railway stations in the Regional Municipality of Niagara
Canadian Register of Historic Places in Ontario